Alexander Ivanovich Yuzhin (1857–1927) was a stage name of the Georgian Prince Sumbatov (Sumbatashvili), who dominated the Malyi Theatre of Moscow at the turn of the 19th and 20th centuries. He was best known for the Romantical parts in the dramas by Schiller and Victor Hugo but also penned a number of plays himself. Yuzhin lived on to become one of the first  People's Artists of the Republic  in 1922.

He was a freemason. Initiated to February 17, 1908 in the masonic lodge "Renaissance" (Grand Orient of France).

References

External links

Russian male actors
Nobility of Georgia (country)
Russian nobility
Russian Freemasons
People's Artists of the RSFSR
Honorary Members of the Russian Academy of Sciences (1917–1925)
Honorary Members of the USSR Academy of Sciences
1857 births
1927 deaths
Russian people of Georgian descent